The All India Youth Federation (AIYF) is a nationwide youth organisation of Communist Party of India founded on May 3, 1959. AIYF is affiliated to World Federation of Democratic Youth. And member of general council of WFDY.

Formation
It was being more and more felt that without a national youth organisation and a national perspective it was not possible to build countrywide movements and to respond to the needs of the youth on an all India scale. The movement would remain isolated confined to the states

With this end in view the first conference of the All India Youth Federation was held from April 28 to May 3, 1959, in Delhi. 250 delegates and observers representing youth organisations of eleven states attended this six-day session.

Fraternal delegates also attended the conference from Bharat Yuvak Samaj, All India Students Federation, Federation of Indian Youth, All India Rural Youth Federation and the Students Union of the Calcutta University

Among the delegates from abroad, the general secretary of the WFDY and the first secretary of People's Youth of Indonesia also attended.

The importance of the conference can be understood from the fact that it received messages of greetings from Vice-President of India Dr. Radhakrishnan, Mayor of Bombay, and several other Indian and foreign important personalities and organisations.

Mayor of Delhi Smt Aruna Asaf Ali in her speech inspired tremendous confidence among the delegates. Dr Gyanchand, the honored guest inaugurated the Conference. On the second day, the Central Law Minister A.K. Sen, Prof. Hiren Mukherjee and others, addressed the conference. They also addressed a symposium on "Youth and the Nation".

The delegates from different states presented their reports. They related their experiences of mass movements and organisations and problems. The reports of West Bengal and Andhra were particularly valuable.

The deliberations convinced the delegates that the conference did not intend to create an all India organisation without a base. In fact, movements existed in the various states and flowed towards a common goal of all India nature. Therefore, the formation of an all India youth center was necessary and natural. This would make a decisive contribution to the unity of the youth movements including the unorganized ones. A united all India platform and co-ordination center would give a decisive impetus to the movement.

A good debate on the objectives and character of the all India organisation took place. The draft Policy Statement and the Constitution evoked lively discussions in which 55 delegates took part. These documents were adopted after intense debate for three days.

Sharp discussion took place on two main points of the Policy Statement. 
 Whether the AIYF should propagate socialism as one of its main aims:
 The attitude to general political questions and the political parties.

On the first point, at least it was agreed that though the broad ideas of socialism were becoming popular among youth, there also existed sharp differences on this question. Some believed in scientific socialism, others in democratic socialism and so on. Except Andhra Youth Federation, no other constituent organisation had accepted socialism as organizational aim. Even then, it was unanimously accepted that some of the basic ideas of socialism were clear to the youth. Therefore, it was finally decided that propagation of the ideas like the equality of rights and an end to class divisions should be incorporated among the aims of the AIYF.

On the second point, it was made clear by the discussion that the AIYF would not simply confine itself to sports and culture alone. These activities were important. But the AIYF would also participate in, organize and lead struggles and activities on unemployment, illiteracy, sovereignty, national independence, democracy, lack of facilities for training and health, etc. as a responsible organisation. Besides, it would participate actively in politics and political activities. Therefore, it was also a political organisation.

The All India Youth Federation made it clear that 'it will not have any allegiance to any political party. The AIYF would be an independent organisation of the youth on the basis of the programme molded by the youth. Its policies would correspond to the interests of the youth of the country. At the same time, there would be no discrimination against the members and followers of any political parties as long as they abided by the aims and constitution of the organisation. There was no claim to a monopoly of youth movement. Other organisations and movements were recognized as a force. The AIYF decided to bring about co-operation among youths belonging to all the youth organisations on common issues, not only the members of particular parties, but more so the vast majority of masses following them.

Besides these two important documents, the conference adopted a Programme of Action for the ensuing months, such as observance of May 16, 1959, as anti US-Pak Pact Day, and campaigns in solidarity with the Algerian youth, etc.

Through several resolutions, the AIYF conference demanded of the government of India to liberate Goa, expressed solidarity with the colonial peoples, and wished success for the Geneva conference and asked for urgent attention to the problem of unemployment in preparation of the third five-year plan.

The AIYF conference decided to affiliate itself to the World Federation of Democratic Youth (WFDY) and thus to be a part of world youth movement. In its opinion, the WFDY was the only worldwide organisation with an understanding of world situation, being consistent in the fight against colonialism. The World Federation of Democratic Youth (WFDY) was founded in London in 1945 in the wake of the victory over world fascism led by Hitler. Youth had played a great in the Second World War to defeat the forces of Germany, Japan and Italy. The WFDY was the result of this young optimism after Second World War.

The conference elected a council of 121 members, which in turn elected a 37-member executive committee and office bearers.

The famous film personality Balraj Sahani was elected president of the AIYF and Sarada Mitra the general secretary. Among the vice-presidents were P.K. Vasudevan Nair, Chintamani Panigrahi, Krishna Chandra Chaudhary, Sukumar Gupta and Satyanarayan. Vasudevan Nair also acted as the chairman of the Executive Committee. The secretaries were Sushil Chakravarty, Ganesh Vidyarthi and Desraj Goel, two seats remaining vacant.

At that time, the AIYF represented more than two lakh youths of the country, who were the members of the constituent units; it was poised to become a bigger organisation.

History

The All India Youth Federation (AIYF) came into being in 1959. Till that year constituent units and organizations existed independently in the various states and regions of India. The different state, district and local democratic youth organizations used to function separately, though there was some kind of co-ordination between them to a lesser or greater degree. The separate youth organizations, which later formed the AIYF, were gradually evolving common aims and objects, and in the course of time felt the need for an organisation at national level. Firebrand Communist and the youngest Councillor of Delhi MCD, Guru Radha Kishan took initiative to organise the first meet of upcoming organisation, to be held in Delhi.

The foundation conference of the All India Youth Federation was held in New Delhi, from 28 April to 3 May 1959.  The six-day session, was attended by over 250 delegates and observers, from 11 states.  The conference announced the formation of the AIYF. The conference decided that the AIYF would propagate the ideas of socialism.  It decided to affiliate with the World Federation of Democratic Youth (WFDY) and thus to be a part of world youth movement..  Famous artist and film personality Balraj Sahani was elected as the first president of AIYF and Sarada Mitra as General Secretary.  P.K. Vasudevan Nair was elected the chairman of the executive committee of the AIYF.

First conference, 1959

The first conference of the All India Youth Federation was held from 28 April to 3 May 1959 in Delhi. 250 delegates and observers representing youth organizations of eleven (11) states attended this six-day session. The conference elected a council of 121 members, which in turn elected a 37-member executive committee and office bearers.

Second conference, 1961

The second conference of the All India Youth Federation was held in Hyderabad from 19 to 21 May 1961. 306 delegates and observers from 12 states attended the conference. They freely and frankly discussed the issues affecting the life of the youth of the country. A large number of fraternal delegates were present e.g. from WFDY, Czechoslovak Youth Union, and Sri Lanka Freedom Party Youth League of Ceylon. Similarly, the other Indian organisations, which sent delegates, were Youth Hostels Association. Socialist Youth League, AISF, AITUC, All India Kisan Sabha.

Third conference, 1965-66 

The Pondicherry conference was a success beyond expectations and broke all the previous records. It was held from 29 December 1965 to 3 January 1966 in Pondicherry. About 600 delegates participated, which was quite revealing. It showed that the AIYF was gradually winning over the youth. The tremendous potentials of the AIYF induced many delegates to join the conference.

Adoption of scientific socialism:

The adoption of scientific socialism by the conference as the aim of the AIYF was a significant decision. It provided a new ideological orientation to the organisation. Great controversies and heated debates were generated before and during the conference on whether it should be adopted as the aim of the organisation or not. One major opinion was that adoption of scientific socialism would restrict the scope of AIYF. Many young people would then not join it thinking that it was attached to a particular ideology of Marxism.

The other major opinion was that socialism has become quite common and popular, and had been adopted in one form or the other, by almost all the political parties. As we know, even BJP (then Jan Sangh) had begun talking of "humanist" or "Gandhian" socialism! Therefore, AIYF must adopt and popularize scientific socialism as distinct from several other socialisms that were in circulation. That would impart a clear-cut direction and perspective to the youth. Acceptance of scientific socialism was of course, not a precondition to the membership of AIYF. The AIYF would educate the youth and its members in this ideology.

Fourth conference, 1969

The fourth conference of All India Youth Federation was held from 26 to 28 December 1969 in Delhi. It was attended by over three hundred delegates from all over India and was inaugurated by S.A. Dange. The conference was also attended by several foreign delegates from Vietnam, Rumania, USSR, Bulgaria, WFDY, etc.

The conference discussed the youth issues in three commissions. These commissions were on working report and organizational problems, "present situation and the tasks of the youth", and programme of action.

The conference decided that the main task of the organisation was to mobilize the younger generation for democratic and political movements through ideological education on the basis of scientific socialism.

Fifth conference, 1974

The fifth conference of AIYF was held in Cochin from 17 to 20 January 1974.

The period since 1969 Delhi conference was one of unprecedented political and social upheavals. The Congress had split, banks had been nationalized, privy purses withdrawn and new possibilities for the growth of left, democratic and progressive forces had opened up. Progressive forces were on the advance and new alignment of forces and parties was taking place. Polarisation between progressive and reactionary forces was developing.

The reports from the states in the conference assessed the tremendous impact of these and other events on the youth and student movements. They also reviewed the role of youth in the mass movements of the period. Struggles on sectional and general demands were reviewed. Assuming a correct ideological standpoint, the AIYF had expanded its mass base and influence. This was reflected in the fact that while only 300 delegates has participated in Delhi (1969) conference, 975 delegates and 117 observers attended the Cochin AIYF conference. Only Meghalaya and Jammu & Kashmir went un-represented. Out of this number, 405 were young workers, 19 doctors, 54 advocates and 87 students. So far as their educational background was concerned 306 were graduates, 240 matriculates, 29 illiterates, and the rest had elementary or secondary education.

Question of ideology:

Both the youth and student conferences finally settled the question of ideology. They unanimously adopted Marxism–Leninism as the guide to revolutionary practice. The respective national councils reached the decision in June 1972 in Hyderabad after prolonged discussions.

This did not mean that the character of AIYF and AISF would be restricted as mass organisations. The AIYF would continue to attract and enroll common youths of factories, farms, universities, services, unemployed etc. They would be drawn into various spheres of sports, culture, physical training, entertainment, etc. At the same time attempts would be made to lead them into struggles on the specific demands.

The youth would be educated and politicised in the theory of Marxism–Leninism after they joined.

Sixth conference, 1979

The sixth conference of All India Youth Federation was held in Hyderabad from 15 to 17 May 1979. The conference gave a clarion call to the youth to fight the RSS seriously and to defend secularism and national unity. The dangerous growth of RSS was a serious threat to the nation in the wake of the formation of Janata Dal government in 1977. The RSS and its concept of Hindu Rashtra had acquired new aggressiveness. It penetrated into police, bureaucracy and government institutions. The conference called upon the youth to meet the RSS threat and to chalk out a programme of action on all India basis.

Seventh conference, 1983

The seventh conference of the AIYF was held in Patna from 13 to 16 January 1983. AIYF decided to continue 'job or jail'campaign in a more militant manner by organising padayatras at all levels, with the main padayatras in a few selected centers. They were to cover villages throughout the country and were to culminate in Delhi March.

About 1200 delegates attended the conference from all the states. It was great success. Fraternal delegates from 15 countries were also present.

Eighth conference, 1985

The eighth conference of All India Youth Federation was held from 1 to 3 November 1985 in Bilaspur, Madhya Pradesh 600 delegates attended it from all the states, also by foreign delegates from several countries. The venue of the conference was named after Sarada Mitra, the founder general secretary of AIYF. The hall in which the delegates session took place was named after the recently hanged young South African poet and freedom fighter Benjamin Moloise.

In a resolution, AIYF demanded immediate release of African National Congress leader Nelson Mandela. The conference also hoped that the forthcoming Geneva conference between USA and USSR would come out with positive results.

Ninth conference, 1990

The ninth conference of AIYF was held from 3 to 6 May 1990 in Cochin (Kerala). Its mammoth rally gave a stirring call to all the progressive, democratic and secular youth organisations to fight for the task. "Save India, Change India".

The conference had the defence of national unity and secularism as its running theme. It decided to organise a march to Parliament on September 13, 1990, with the slogan "Save India, Change India".

600 delegates from all over India attended the Cochin conference. In the end, a declaration was adopted. Several other resolutions were also passed.

AIYF decided to initiate the following campaigns:

It was decided to organise seminars in July 1990 on national unity and secularism, right to work, job or unemployment allowance.
 Campaign fortnight from 15 to 30 August at local levels through padayatras, cycle rallies, processions etc.
 All India March to the Parliament on 13 September 1990.

Tenth conference, 1993

The tenth conference of All India Youth Federation was held from 26 to 29 September 1993 in Sangrur (Punjab). It was attended by 427 delegates, and by 34 foreign guests.

The conference started with a massive rally on 26 September in which thousands of rural youth participated. The rally was addressed by the general secretary of CPI Indrajit Gupta, well known film personality A.K. Hangal, president of WFDY, Andle Yawa and several others.

Eleventh conference, 1996

Eleventh national conference of All India Youth Federation was held in Calcutta from 8 to 11 December 1996. Delegates from at least twenty states had reached Calcutta. Presence of 35 fraternal delegates from different countries greatly inspired the participants. The conference was attended by 869 delegates and 25 observers. The conference demanded creation of a national youth fund to assist generation of self-employment. It urged the government to lift the ban upon recruitment.

The existing National Youth Policy (NYP) did not accord with the present situation, and therefore the UF government should come out with a new NYP. Broad participation of youth from the grass root level in the decision – making process alone could ensure evolution of a comprehensive youth policy aimed at their better future.

Twelfth conference, 2003

The twelfth national conference of the AIYF was held from 2 to 5 April 2003 in Patna (Bihar). It was attended by 600 delegates from 23 states. The conference was also attended by the WFDY president Michael and by fraternal delegates from Sri Lanka, Bangladesh, Nepal and Cuba. The conference adopted a 'Document on Youth Policy' and a 'Youth Declaration and Information on Employment Situation'.

Thirteenth conference, 2007

The thirteenth conference of the All India Youth Federation was held from 28 to 31 March 2007 in Sirsa (Haryana). It was attended by 672 delegates from 24 states.

The thirteenth AIYF conference was attended by the fraternal delegates from the WFDY, and from youth organizations of China, Greece, Sri Lanka, Burma, Bangladesh, Nepal and Cuba

AIYF National Conferences

Organisational structure

These are the organs of the organisation:
 National Conference
 General Council
 State council
 District council
 Taluk or subdivisional council
 Local or primary unit

The flag of AIYF
The flag is three units long and two units high. The right two-thirds are red, and the remaining third is sky blue. On the top left corner of the flag is a five-pointed red star.

The red in the flag stands for the revolutionary zeal of the youth and the sky blue symbolises their desire for peace. The red star stands for revolutionary idealism and honesty and the five corners of the star represent the solidarity and friendship of the youth of all five continents.

References

External links
Official Facebook Page
 All India Youth Federation
 ALL India youth Federation

India
Communist Party of India mass organisations
1959 establishments in India
Youth organizations established in 1959
Organizations established in 1959
Volunteer organisations in India
World Federation of Democratic Youth